Barn is an unincorporated community in Mercer County, in the U.S. state of West Virginia.

History
A post office called Barn was established in 1879, and remained in operation until 1940. A large barn near the original town site caused the name to be selected.

References

Unincorporated communities in Mercer County, West Virginia
Unincorporated communities in West Virginia